Overcast Media Inc. is a digital media technology company based in Seattle, Washington. Overcast Media partners with other media companies to help them add user generated content on top of existing video assets. Their service makes it easy for anyone to add their own commentary to television shows, sporting events and movies, while respecting the intellectual property rights of the underlying television show.

Technology
Overcast Media has developed a synchronization technology which allows authors to create commentary over one video source (ex. a digital recording) and allows consumers to view the commentary in sync with a different video source (ex. a show acquired through Amazon Unbox). This process is called overcasting. Additionally, their synchronization technology works with many Flash-based players currently in use online. Overcasting handles timing variations found across different sources and file formats. Along with audio commentary, overcasts can contain text, web links, graphics and arbitrary meta-data.

Availability
Currently, the Flash-based player is available on their own site and on partner sites like RiffTrax's. The client-side software is now available only to partners. The service may be accessed on the Overcast Media homepage. At present, the Flash-based player is available for Mac, Linux and Windows XP and Vista. The client-side components are only available for XP and Vista.

External links 
RiffTrax.com
Personal Video meets TV at Overcast intersection

Software companies based in Seattle
Defunct software companies of the United States